Kira Rural LLG is a local-level government (LLG) of Oro Province, Papua New Guinea. The Tauade language is spoken in the LLG.

Wards
01. Pepeware
02. Gobe
03. Upupuro
04. Ovasupu
05. Oibo

References

Local-level governments of Oro Province